Bride and Groom may refer to:

 Bride and Groom (radio program) (1945-1950), an old-time radio program
 Bride and Groom (TV series) (1951-1958), based on the radio show
 Bride and Groom (rock formation)
 Bride and Groom (book), a 2018 novel

See also 
 Bride and Gloom (disambiguation)